Tõnu Raadik (born 15 December 1957 in Jõhvi) is an Estonian actor, composer and violinist.

In 1980 he graduated from Tallinn State Conservatory's Performing Arts Department, and in 1992 the same institution in composition speciality. From 1980 until 1986, he played at Estonian Puppet Theatre, and from 1986 until 1992, at the Estonian Youth Theatre. Since 1993 he is a freelancer. Besides theatre roles he has played also in several films.

He has written chamber, theatre, and film music. He has been a member of music groups, e.g. in Kukerpillid (1976–1986 and 1997–1998).

Filmography

 1983: Suletud ring (feature film; role: Roland Ern)
 1989: Inimene, keda polnud (feature film; composer and in role:	Hans Brandt)
 1994: Ameerika mäed (feature film; composer)
 2021: Kaka ja kevad (animated film; composer)

References

Living people
1957 births
Estonian male stage actors
Estonian male film actors
20th-century Estonian male actors
20th-century Estonian composers
21st-century Estonian composers
Estonian violinists
Estonian Academy of Music and Theatre alumni
People from  Jõhvi